This is a list of banks in Cambodia.

, there were 51 commercial banks, 14 specialized banks, 75 microfinance institutions, 7 microfinance deposit-taking institutions, 6 representative offices, and 15 leasing companies in Cambodia.

, there were 54 commercial banks, 10 specialized banks, 79 microfinance institutions, 6 microfinance deposit-taking institutions, 6 representative offices, and 17 financial leasing companies in Cambodia. 

As of June 20, 2022, National Bank of Cambodia here are 58 commercial banks in Cambodia.

Central bank

National Bank of Cambodia

Locally-owned banks

Foreign-owned, Joint Venture, or Subsidiary banks

See also 
 Cambodia and the World Bank
 Cambodia and the International Monetary Fund
 Economy of Cambodia

References

External links
 Cambodia - U.S. Banks and Local Correspondent Banks
 List of Banks in Cambodia

Cambodia
Banks
Banks